Arthur William Ryder (March 8, 1877 – March 21, 1938) was a professor of Sanskrit at the University of California, Berkeley. He is best known for translating a number of Sanskrit works into English, including the Panchatantra and the Bhagavad Gita.

In the words of G. R. Noyes,

Life
Ryder was born on March 8, 1877, at Oberlin, Ohio, in the United States. He had his early education at Ann Arbor, Michigan, and the Phillips Academy in Andover, Massachusetts, from which he graduated in June 1894, to join Harvard University. He got his A.B. degree from Harvard in June 1897. After teaching Latin and literature at Andover for a year, he went to Germany for graduate studies. He studied at the University of Berlin and the University of Leipzig, from which he got the degree of Doctor of Philosophy in 1901, with a dissertation on the Rbhus in the Ṛgveda. He was an instructor in Sanskrit at Harvard University from 1902 until January 1906, when he moved to the University of California at Berkeley, to its linguistics department, as an instructor in Sanskrit and German.
He became an instructor in Sanskrit alone later in the same year, became assistant professor in 1908, associate professor in 1919, and professor in 1925. From his arrival at Berkeley until his death, Sanskrit was a separate department with Ryder as chairman and sole member, after which it was absorbed into the Department of Classics. When in summer 1920 Berkeley first began offering courses in religion and religious education, Ryder was among the faculty, along with Herbert Francis Evans, Walter Goodnow Everett, Morris Jastrow Jr., and Walter B. Pitkin.

He was a member of the American Oriental Society and the American Philological Association. He was also a member of the Phi Beta Kappa Society, and wrote the society's annual poem for its meeting in 1912. It is also said that he was at one time ranked one of the two best chess players on the Pacific Coast.

Work
In 1905, when still at Harvard, Ryder translated Śudraka's Mṛcchakatika into English as The Little Clay Cart, which was published as volume 9 of the Harvard Oriental Series. He translated Kālidāsa's Abhijñānaśākuntalam, Meghadūta, and other works, as well as the Bhagavad Gita
and several volumes of verse translated from works by Bhartṛhari and others. His prose translations included the Panchatantra in 1925,
excerpts from which were published as Gold's Gloom,
Daṇḍin's Daśakumāracarita as The Ten Princes of Dandin, and Twenty-Two Goblins, a translation of Vetala Panchavimshati. He also wrote excellent original verse which he circulated privately, but did not publish.

Some verses from his translations were set to music.
His Little Clay Cart was enacted at the Hearst Greek Theatre in Berkeley in 1907, a production that included a real live elephant on stage.
Also enacted there in 1914 was Shakuntala, which was performed by the Mountain Play Association, who were invited to perform there after their performance in a natural amphitheatre on top of Mount Tamalpais, California.
These two were the only Indian dramas performed there until 2004.
His Little Clay Cart was also enacted in New York City in 1924 at the Neighborhood Playhouse, which was then an off-Broadway theatre, at the Theater de Lys in 1953,
and at the Potboiler Art Theater in Los Angeles in 1926, when it featured actors such as James A. Marcus, Symona Boniface and Gale Gordon.
Following his death in 1938, some of his original poems were published in a posthumous memorial volume with a biography, along with several of his translated verses. This was the only book of original poetry published by the University of California Press for several decades.

Views on scholarship and education
He was known for his love of the language, preferring to publish whatever most delighted him, rather than scholarly articles. In fact, he was outspoken in his contempt for such articles, holding the view that Sanskrit ought to be studied not for philological reasons, but for the great literature it opened.

Perhaps for this reason, Time magazine described him as the "greatest Sanskrit student of his day", and an Italian Sanskritist said of him: "Ten men like that would make a civilization".

At a time when the university curriculum was undergoing upheavals, Ryder was a staunch defender of the traditional system of education in the classics. In his ideal world, the university curriculum would have been mostly limited to Latin, Greek, and mathematics, with subjects like history, philosophy, physics, and languages like Sanskrit, Hebrew, German, and French being allowed to serious students only later, as a sort of reward. The then-new disciplines like psychology and sociology were dismissed "out of hand as not worth damning."

Style of translation
His translations were noted for their high fidelity to the originals
despite his practice of translating into lively and natural conversational language
using rhyme and modern English idiom:

In particular, his translation of the Shakuntala was regarded as the best at the time, his "accurate and charming" translation of the Panchatantra remains popular and highly regarded, while his translation of the Bhagavad Gita was not so successful.

Legacy
Despite being described as "a loner with a caustic wit", as an educator he was encouraging and generous toward students, and consequently he found many devoted students. Harold F. Cherniss described him as "a friend half divine in his great humanity". When Anthony Boucher, who had been a student of his at Berkeley, wrote his novel The Case of the Seven of Calvary, he based the lead character of "Dr. Ashwin", professor of Sanskrit, after Ryder. (Ashvin is a Sanskrit word meaning a "rider".)

Another of his devoted students was J. Robert Oppenheimer. In 1933, Oppenheimer, then 29, was a young physics professor at Berkeley and studied Sanskrit under Ryder. Ryder introduced him to the Bhagavad Gita, which they read together in the original language. Later Oppenheimer cited it as one of the most influential books to shape his philosophy of life, famously recalling the Gita at the Trinity test.
He described his teacher thus:

Ryder died on March 21, 1938, of a heart attack, while teaching an advanced class with only one student.

Bibliography
Articles
Although Ryder disdained "scholarship", he published a few scholarly papers early in his career.
 . Dissertation (in German).
 
 
 

Translations
Besides books, some were published in the University of California Chronicle.
 
 . A story translated from the Hitopadesha.
 
  Translations from Bilhaṇa's Chaura-panchashika, the Ramayana, Mahabharata, Raghuvamsha, etc.
 
 
 
 
 
 . Translated from Kathāsaritsāgara, Canto 104, which inspired the plot of Bhavabhuti's drama Mālati-mādhava.
 
 
 
 
 
 
 
 

 Original poems

References

External links
 
 
 
 The Panchatantra of Vishnu Sarma: English Translation, at Hinduism E-Books

Sanskrit–English translators
American translators
American Indologists
Harvard University alumni
Leipzig University alumni
University of California, Berkeley faculty
American Sanskrit scholars
Translators of Kalidasa
1877 births
1938 deaths
Translators of the Bhagavad Gita